Viajaya Ganda Gopalan was a Telugu Chola king who ruled over Kanchi.

Life 
His full name, as it appears in inscriptions, is 'Tribhuvanachakravathi Vijayagandagopaladeva'. He called himself 'Lord of Kanchi'. His rule began in 1250 CE as an independent king. His kingdom witnessed crucial developments during 1250–1291. Kanchi changed hands in rapid succession among Telugu Chodas, Kakatiyas, Kadava Kopperunjinga and the Pandyas. The change of rule often meant only the de jure change of the overlords. He remained as the local chieftain of Kanchi. His reign was coeval with Rajendra III, Jatavarman Sundara Pandya, Kopperunjinga and Kakateeya Ganapathi.

He issued his own regnal system between 1253 and 1291, which are found in the Varadaraja Swami Temple. This long rule was interrupted by intrusions. For example, Kopperunjunga is recognized as King of Kanchi from 1253–1254 AD, again in May 1257 and again in 1260. In the same years, Vijaya GandaGopala is also recognized as ruler of kanchi. This shows the rapid changes in political fortunes of Kanchi and that at one time, rival kings were w54ontlysupported by their adherents.

In 1260 AD, Jatavarman II overran Viaya Gandagopala Territory and marched as far as Nellore where he performed 'Virabhisheka'. He anointed himself as king of kanchi.

References

13th-century Indian monarchs
History of Tamil Nadu
Chola kings
People from Kanchipuram district